The Bréguet Type IV was an aircraft built  by Bréguet Aviation. It was first flown in 1911, and was the first Bréguet aircraft to be produced in quantity. It was used by the French Army and the British Royal Flying Corps. It is notable for the extensive use of metal in its construction, unusual in an aircraft of its time.

Design and development
The Bréguet Type IV was developed from the Bréguet Type III which had appeared during 1910. It was a tractor biplane with a tricycle undercarriage.

Variants and nomenclature

The Bréguet Type IV was produced in a number of variants, differing in their seating arrangement and in the engine fitted. Although Bréguet's earlier aircraft were referred to using a type number, the aircraft produced after the Type III were generally referred to using an airframe number and a letter/number combination denoting the type of engine fitted.
  
G, later G.1 powered by a  Gnome Omega
 G.2 powered by a  Gnome
 G.3 powered by a  Gnome Gnome Double Omega
 G.4 powered by a  Gnome Gnome Double Lambda
 R.1 powered by a  REP
 R.2 powered by a  REP
 L.1 powered by a  Renault 50/60 hp (the 'L' for Louis Renault)
 L.2 powered by a  Renault
 C.1 powered by a  Chenu
 C.2 powered by an  Chenu
 U.1 powered by an  Canton-Unné
 U.2 powered by an  Canton-Unné
 D.1 powered by a  Dansette
 O.1 powered by an  Le Rhône

Survivors

An example, an R.U.1, is on display at the Musée des Arts et Métiers in Paris.

Specifications (L-1 Cruiser)

Notes

References

 

1910s French experimental aircraft
  IV
Aircraft first flown in 1911
Single-engined tractor aircraft